Blayne Wilson (born 26 January 1992) is an Australian rules footballer who previously played with the West Coast Eagles in the Australian Football League (AFL). From Mandurah, Western Australia, he represented his state at the 2009 National Under-18 Championships, and was selected as full-back in that year's under-18 All-Australian team. In the West Australian Football League, Wilson made his senior debut for  during the 2009 season, playing four games, and went on to play another seven games during the 2010 season, but was hampered by osteitis pubis and ankle injuries, missing several games. In part due to these injury concerns, he was overlooked in the 2010 National Draft (held in November 2010), despite having been considered likely to be drafted in the early rounds. Wilson was subsequently invited to train with West Coast during the pre-season, and was drafted by the club with the second selection in the following month's 2011 Pre-season Draft.

Unable to break into West Coast's senior line-up immediately, Wilson established himself as a defender in Peel Thunder's senior team, playing seventeen games during the 2011 season. He played a further eight games for Peel during the following season, but missed the second half of the season due to ankle injuries. Wilson made his senior debut for West Coast against  in round ten of the 2013 season,  replacing the injured Darren Glass. In the match, played at Etihad Stadium, he recorded 21 disposals and ten marks.

Wilson was delisted at the end of the 2014 AFL season.  He joined South Fremantle for the 2015 WAFL season.

References

External links

 WAFL playing statistics
 West Coast Eagles player profile

1992 births
Australian rules footballers from Western Australia
East Perth Football Club players
Living people
Peel Thunder Football Club players
People from Mandurah
West Coast Eagles players
South Fremantle Football Club players